Darren Porter (born 2 August 1972) is an Australian former professional rugby league footballer who played for the Canberra Raiders in the National Rugby League.

Playing career
Porter was 28 years and 304 days of age when he made his NRL debut for Canberra in the 2001 season, making him one of the oldest first-grade debutants in the modern era. 

A forward, he made all of his 15 first-grade appearances off the interchange bench, from 2001 to 2004.

References

External links
Darren Porter at Rugby League project

1972 births
Living people
Australian rugby league players
Canberra Raiders players
Rugby league forwards